The Douglas Islands are two small islands  northwest of Cape Daly, and  north of Andersen Island, as well as  north-east of Child Rocks, which are both part of the Robinson Group. The islands lie off the coast of Mac. Robertson Land in Antarctica.

They were discovered by the British Australian New Zealand Antarctic Research Expedition under Douglas Mawson, 1929–1931, and named for Vice-Admiral Percy Douglas, then hydrographer of the Royal Navy.

In 1956, an Australian National Antarctic Research Expeditions sledge party led by P.W. Crohn was unable to find them in this position, but found two uncharted islands farther south to which the name has now been applied.

See also 
 List of Antarctic and sub-Antarctic islands

References 

Islands of Mac. Robertson Land